The Hiram Smith House is a buff brick, two-story octagonal house located in Neenah in the U.S. state of Wisconsin. The home features a porch on three sides. It was owned by Hiram Smith. The home is listed on the National Register of Historic Places.

References

External links

Neenah Historical Society

Houses in Winnebago County, Wisconsin
Houses on the National Register of Historic Places in Wisconsin
Octagon houses in Wisconsin
National Register of Historic Places in Winnebago County, Wisconsin